The 2022 FIBA U18 Women's Asian Championship was the qualifying tournament for FIBA Asia at the 2023 FIBA U19 Women's Basketball World Cup. The tournament, which was also the 25th edition of the biennial competition, was held in Bangalore, India from 5 to 11 September. The top four teams qualified and will represent FIBA Asia in the 2023 FIBA U19 Women's Basketball World Cup in Spain.

Australia defeated the defending champion China in the Final, with a score of 81-55, to annex their first championship overall. Meanwhile, Japan defeated Chinese Taipei, with a score of 77-45, in the Bronze Medal Match. South Korea defeated New Zealand with a score of 73-56 in a fifth-place match.

In Division B, Malaysia won the tournament beating Mongolia 64-53, and was promoted to Division A in the 2024 tournament. In the third-place game, the Philippines beated Samoa with a score of 84-68.

Venues

Qualified teams 
For Division A:
 Top seven teams of the 2018 FIBA Asia U18 Championship for Women Division A:
 
 
 
 
 
 
 
 Winner of the 2018 FIBA Asia U18 Championship for Women Division B:
 

For Division B:
 Number eighth team of the 2018 FIBA Asia U18 Championship for Women Division A:
 
 Two teams from the 2018 FIBA Asia U18 Championship for Women Division B:
 
 
 Other five teams from FIBA Asia:

Competition format
The sixteen participating teams will be divided into two divisions, Division A and Division B of eight teams each.

In each division, the eight participating teams are divided into two groups (A and B) of four teams each.

Each team shall play all the other teams within its own group. The final stage standings will be established after the games for a total of twelve are all played.

Teams that will finish first in each group will advance to the semifinal round, awaiting the winners of the qualification to semifinals round.

Teams that will finish second and third in each group will face the third-placed and second-placed team, respectively, in the other group within its own division for the qualification to semifinals round.

Winners of the qualification to semifinals round will face the outright semifinalists in the semifinal round. Losers will face each other for the fifth-sixth place classification round.

For the seventh-eighth place classification round, teams that will finish fourth in each group will face the other fourth-placed team in the other group within its own division.

For Division A, all semifinalists will qualify to the 2023 FIBA U19 Women's Basketball World Cup.

The Champion team from Division B will be promoted to Division A for the next championship, replacing the eighth-placed team in Division A that will be relegated to Division B for the next championship.

Divisions 
Included were, the FIBA World Rankings prior to the games.

Squads

Division A

Group Phase
The groups were announced on 4 September 2022.

Group A

Group B

Knockout round

Bracket

Seventh place game

Qualification to Semifinals

Fifth place game

Semifinals

Third place game

Final

Final standing

Division B

Group Phase
The groups were announced on 4 September 2022.

Group A

Group B

Knockout round

Bracket

Seventh place game

Qualification to Semifinals

Fifth place game

Semifinals

Third place game

Final

Final standing

References

External links
 2022 FIBA U18 Women's Asian Championship Division A
 2022 FIBA U18 Women's Asian Championship Division B

FIBA Asia Under-18 Championship for Women